{{Infobox settlement

| name                    = Mare' Subdistrict
| native_name             = ناحية مارع
| native_name_lang        = ar
| type                    = Subdistrict
| image_skyline           = 
| image_size              = 
| image_alt               = 
| image_caption           = 
| image_map               = Mare' nahiyah.svg
| mapsize                 = 250x250px
| map_alt                 = Mare' Subdistrict in Syria
| map_caption             = Location of Mare' Subdistrict 
| coordinates             = 
| coor_pinpoint           = Mare'
| pushpin_map             = Syria 
| pushpin_label_position  = bottom
| pushpin_map_caption     = Location in Syria
| pushpin_mapsize         = 250
| subdivision_type        = Country
| subdivision_name        = 
| subdivision_type1       = Governorate
| subdivision_name1       = Aleppo
| subdivision_type2       = District
| subdivision_name2       = Azaz District
| parts_type              = Subdistricts
| parts_style             = para
| p1                      = 
| established_title       = Established
| established_date        = 
| established_title2      = 
| established_date2       = 
| founder                 = 
| named_for               = 
| seat_type               = Seat
| seat                    = Mare'
| government_footnotes    = 
| government_type         = 
| area_total_km2          = 
| area_footnotes          =
| elevation_m             = 
| elevation_point         = Mare'
| elevation_max_m         = 
| elevation_max_point     = 
| elevation_min_m         = 
| elevation_min_point     = 
| elevation_footnotes     = 
| population              = 39306
| population_density_km2  = auto
| population_as_of        = 2004
| population_footnotes    = <ref name=census2004>{{cite web |title=2004 Census Data for ''Nahiya Mare |url=http://www.cbssyr.sy/new%20web%20site/General_census/census_2004/NH/TAB02-25-2004.htm |publisher=Syrian Central Bureau of Statistics |language=ar |access-date=15 October 2015 |archive-url=https://web.archive.org/web/20151208123010/http://www.cbssyr.sy/new%20web%20site/General_census/census_2004/NH/TAB02-25-2004.htm |archive-date=8 December 2015 |url-status=dead }} Also available in English: </ref>
| population_est          = 
| pop_est_as_of           = 
| pop_est_footnotes       = 
| population_demonym      = 
| population_note         = 
| area_code_type          = Area code
| area_code               = 
| geocode                 = SY020403
| website                 = 
| footnotes               = 
}}Mare' Subdistrict'''  is a subdistrict of Azaz District in the Aleppo Governorate of northern Syria. The administrative centre is the city of Mare'. Adjacent subdistricts of Azaz District are Tell Rifaat to the west, Sawran to the north and Akhtarin to the east.

At the 2004 census, the subdistrict had a population of 39,306.

Cities, towns and villages

References 

Azaz District
Mare